Sayin' It with Love is the debut album by Christian singer-songwriter Steve Camp, released in 1978 on Myrrh Records.

Track listing
All songs written by Steve Camp, except where noted.

Note: Never released on CD

Charts

Radio singles

References 

1978 debut albums
Steve Camp albums
Myrrh Records albums